Cardamine pratensis, the cuckoo flower, lady's smock, mayflower, or milkmaids, is a flowering plant in the family Brassicaceae. It is a perennial herb native throughout most of Europe and Western Asia. The specific name pratensis is Latin for "meadow".

Description
Cardamine pratensis is a herbaceous, hairless, perennial plant growing to 40–60 cm tall, with pinnate leaves 5–12 cm long with 3–15 leaflets, each leaflet about 1 cm long. The flowers are produced on a spike 10–30 cm long, each flower 1–2 cm in diameter with four very pale violet-pink (rarely white) petals. The style of the fruit is short or longish. It grows best close to water.

Etymology
Its common name cuckoo flower derives from the formation of the plant's flowers at around the same time as the arrival each spring of the first cuckoos in the British Isles. An alternative 16th century dated tale refers to 'cuckoo spit', which the plant is sometimes covered in, due to a bug called the froghopper and not the cuckoo.

Taxonomy
Cardamine pratensis is a polyploid complex, with all ploidy levels from diploid to decaploid, and dodecaploid, known, as well as frequent aneuploids. It may be treated as a single species, or divided into Cardamine pratensis s.str. (diploid to heptaploid) and Cardamine palustris (syn. Cardamine pratensis subsp. paludosa (Knaf) Celak., Cardamine dentata Schult.)) (octaploid to decaploid).

Distribution
The species is commonly found throughout the British Isles.

Recorded in Ireland from all 40 of the "vice-counties" (a system adopted by Praeger in 1901).

Cultivation
It is grown as an ornamental plant in gardens, and has become naturalised in North America as a result of cultivation. In some European countries, including parts of Germany, the plant is now under threat.

It is a food plant for the orange tip butterfly (Anthocharis cardamines) and makes a valuable addition to any garden which aims at attracting wildlife. It was once used as a substitute for watercress.

Folklore
In folklore it was said to be sacred to the fairies, and so was unlucky if brought indoors. It was not included in May Day garlands for the same reason.

Additional general information
It is the county flower of the English county of Cheshire.

Gallery

References

External links
 

pratensis
Flora of France
Flora of Western Asia
Flora of Portugal
Flora of China
Flora of Japan
Flora of Korea
Flora of Denmark
Flora of Ireland
Flora of Norway
Flora of the United Kingdom
Flora of the Czech Republic
Flora of Lithuania
Flora of Greece
Flora of Italy
Flora of Latvia
Flora of Spain
Flora of Greenland
Flora of Connecticut
Plants described in 1753
Taxa named by Carl Linnaeus
Flora without expected TNC conservation status